Rune Torstein Kidde (27 September 1957 – 21 October 2013) was a Danish writer, storyteller, musician and artist. He was the son of illustrator and painter Thormod Kidde (19 July 1925 – 19 February 1996) and ceramist Ragnhild Kidde (6 March 1929 – 16 September 1997). He graduated from Vestfyns Gymnasium in 1976 and has studied theology for short while. Rune T. Kidde was a multi-talented artist and has released both humorous cartoons, poems, novels, children's books and biographies. Additionally, he made radio features to the Danish Children's Radio and was a folk singer, poet and dramatic.
 
Rune T. Kidde was a prominent member of 1970s Danish cartoon underground. He published "Fields'isten" and fanzines such as "Blomstrende Spaghetti" (Flowering Spaghetti), "Knulp" and "Kong Knud" (King Canute). In 1977 he co-founded the publishing company Baldur og Brage who published the first Danish underground periodical with comics "På Stribe". In 1979 he co-founded the cartoon studio Gimle together with fellow cartoonist Peter Madsen and in 1984 was a founding member of Tegneserieværkstedet (the comics workshop). Rune T. Kiddes own debut as cartoonist was the albums "Rune T. Kidde" and "De siger så meget" (They say so much) in 1980 and up through the 1980s he released a number of comics, as well as the illustrated handbook "Øldrikkerens Lille Grønne" (The Beer Drinker's Little Green – a pun on chairman Mao's Little Red Book). In 1975 Rune T. Kidde founded Folkebevægelsen for W. C. Fields (The People's Movement for W. C. Fields) – one of his great idols. He also made himself honorary member of the movement. In 1990 he lost his eyesight, which was difficult to combine with cartoon production. Still, Rune T. Kidde continued to produce comics and picture books, where other artists – especially Jørgen Mogensen – drew according to his directives.
 
From 1980–1981 he worked as an editor at the comic book publishing company Interpresse, where he edited The Phantom, Beetle Bailey, Komix and Underground. During this time he worked with leading cartoonists such as Mort Walker, Will Eisner and Gilbert Shelton. Throughout the 1980s he worked as an illustrator and writer for Danish newspapers and magazines such as Ekstrabladet, Politiken, Svikmøllen, Euroman and many fanzines.

Radio 
From 1990–2000 Kidde was a freelancer for Danmarks Radios P1, P2 and P3. Among other things he produced travel features from China, Japan, the Caribbean, and the Faroe Islands. He also made a dramatization of The Fellowship of the Ring and his own "Snabelsko and gåsetænder" for the P3 program Børneradio (Kids Radio).

Literature 
He debuted as a literary author with a volume of poems called Gjort bedre før (Done better before) in 1983. In 1993 he published his first novel Rejsen til Alvilva (The Journey to Alvilva) which is built upon the fairytale of Big Klaus and Little Klaus and was his first work of prose. In 1997 he published Midt i himlen, midt i havet (In the midst of the sea, in the midst of heaven), which is a partly autobiographical novel about being blind. In 2010, his experimental psychological thriller, Julius afsind (Julius madness) was chosen as one of the six best books of the year by Danmarks Radio's novel prize committee. The following year he published The Truths Devil's claw, a literary fable of the Russian mystic Rasputin's life.

Biographies and family history 
Besides his works of fiction Rune T. Kidde has written three biographies. Starting with  Leveomkostningerne er steget med en femmer per halvflaske – en bog om W. C. Fields (The cost of living has risen by a fiver per half bottle – a book about W. C. Fields) (1986) about the American comedian W. C. Fields and Thormod Kidde, kvindfolk (Thormod Kidde, womenfolk)(2002) about his father illustrator Thormod Kidde. Moreover, in 2007 he published his autobiography Scribbles, scrabble and creative antics. His interest in personal history was also reflected in a comprehensive family history research, and he stands behind the website haraldkidde.dk about the Danish author Harald Kidde, which also contains information about his brother the conservative politician Aage Kidde.

His mother Ragnhild Kidde was a potter. She was mentally ill, at times borderline psychotic, and unlike his father very outgoing. Rune T. Kidde has told how as a child he felt like an intermediary, a messenger in the eternal commute between the two parents, who for long periods did not talk to each other, and for equally long periods left their son to himself.

The insecure upbringing was, Rune T. Kidde himself thought, a strong contributing factor to the fact that at the age of 15 he suffered from severe depression, which plagued him until he turned 30.

But there was another side of the coin, a black sense of humour, which - as he eventually gained control of his creative urge - enabled him to live with his depressions. And created fertile ground for the title he often gave himself:

Denmark's most optimistic pessimist.

Musician 
Rune T. Kidde was also an accomplished musician and singer and was active in Trio Confetti. In 2000 he wrote a libretto for the children's opera "Heksemutter Mortensen og den fede kalkun" (Witch mother Mortensen and the fat Turkey) for The Danish Royal Theatre, with music provided by the composer Fuzzy. The opera was directed by Kasper Holten. He has also written lyrics for other artists including Nanna Lüders Jensen and folk singer Bente Kure.

Movies and theatre 
Kidde made his debut as a playwright in 1983 with the play "En måge over Ejer Bavnehøj" (A seagull over Ejer Bavnehøj) at Det Danske Teater and as an actor in 2005 in Jon Bang Carlsen's English language movie Blinded Angels which takes place in Cape Town in South Africa.

Bibliography

Cartoons and comics 
 Blomstrende Spaghetti, 1977–1986 
 Rune T. Kidde, 1980
 Man siger så meget, 1980
 Gal og normal, 1982
 Må jeg høfligst anmode dem om at tage denne sag alvorligt, 1984
 Litterærlige klassikere, 1988
 Menigmands guide til det indre marked, 1992

Poetry 
 Gjort bedre før, 1983
 Fuglefri, 1998
 Hvor er fyrvogteren?, 2002
 Året rundt på gulvet – hyldest til ottetallet, 2005

Novels 
 Rejsen til Alvilva, 1993
 Midt i himlen, midt i havet, 1997
 Da Henry Høj gik over i historien, 2000
 Hr. og fru Dicht i Island, 2008
 Julius afsind, 2009
 Sandhedens djævlekløer, 2011

Biographies 
 Leveomkostningerne er steget med en femmer per halvflaske – en bog om W. C. Fields, 1986
 Øllet blev hans skæbne, 1999
 Thormod Kidde – Kvindfolk, 2002
 Kruseduller, kragetæer og kreative krumspring (autobiography), 2007

References

External links 
 Anders T. Jensen, Karsten J Jørgensen (ed.), Adventurous Rune T. Kidde, Ultima, 1994
 Rune T. Kidde: Scribbles, scrabble and creative antics, Modtryk, 2007
 Rune T. Kiddes website 
 Tegneseriemuseet (Danish Cartoon Museum)
 Website about author Harald Kidde and the Kidde family 
 Ping Award
 DR Novel Prize 2009 – nomination 
 Biography at Forfatterweb

1957 births
2013 deaths
Danish comics artists
Danish cartoonists
Danish humorists
Danish radio presenters
Danish folk singers
Danish male poets
Danish male singer-songwriters
20th-century Danish dramatists and playwrights
20th-century Danish poets
21st-century Danish poets
20th-century Danish male writers
21st-century Danish male writers
20th-century Danish male singers
21st-century Danish male singers
21st-century Danish dramatists and playwrights
Danish male dramatists and playwrights
Olufsen Records artists